Syed Sadatullah Husaini (سید سعادت اللہ حسینی; born June 7, 1973) is the  president (Amir) of Jamaat-e-Islami Hind (JIH). He is the former two time National President of Students Islamic Organisation of India. He has been heading the JIH's Study and Research Department as its director. He is a regular columnist in various magazines, journals and newspapers writing on current issues and state of affairs. He is based in Hyderabad.

Biography 

He was educated in the town of Nanded, Maharashtra, where he graduated in electronics and telecommunication engineering. As a student, he was associated with Students Islamic Organisation of India and was its president for two consecutive terms (1999–2003).

When he joined the Markazi Majlis-e-Shura of Jamaat-e-Islami Hind, he was its youngest member. He was on the boards of many social and academic organizations in Hyderabad, Bangalore, Delhi and Aligarh.

Views

Globalization and capitalism 

He says that although Islam stands for globalization and universal brotherhood, modern globalization is a tool of exploitation that creates economic and social inequality. Globalization has resulted in the monopoly of western cultural and ethical values and has undermined the political sovereignty of the nation states.

Feminism and women 

Sadat Husaini is critical of both the traditional Muslim societies and the modern western societies for their treatment of women. According to him, the traditional Muslim societies have not given the women their due place and rights as stipulated by Islam, while the modern western societies have snatched femininity and the very essence of womanhood from women in lieu of equality.

Muslim politics in India 

Sadat argues that the right path for Muslims in a pluralistic society such as India is to engage in healthy dialogue with majority non-Muslim communities and contribute in a positive manner to the nation-building. He has been critical of the conspiracy theories, blame games and ghettoized politics and has always urged fellow Muslims to develop positive mental attitude and strengthen the communication channels with the majority community in India.

Postmodernism 

In an exclusive paper Sadat has argued that postmodernism is logically incorrect notion and it is an extreme reaction to modernism. According to him, the position of Islam that divinely revealed truths are absolute and all other truths are relative, is a perfectly balanced notion that is free from the contradictions of postmodernism. He has supported the transmodernism notion of Ziauddin Sardar, and argued that Islam is a transmodern reality.

Right to Education Act 
The Indian parliament has passed the Right to Education Act (RTE). It holds the government responsible for providing education to every citizen of the country. Criticizing the RTE act, Mr. Sadat said that it has negated minorities' constitutional rights and Muslims will not be able to run their religious educational institutions and madrasas.

Books and articles 

He has published the following books so far:

His last five books have been translated into Telugu, Kannada and Hindi. His interview has been published in the following book: "Muslim Leadership in India" - Global Media Publications, New Delhi.

He has published more than 200 articles in Urdu and English. His article "Cyberistan Ki Muaashirat" has been widely published and translated.

See also 
 Jamaat-e-Islami Hind
 Students Islamic Organisation of India
 Jalaluddin Umri
 Malik Motasim Khan

References

External links
 Jamaat-e-Islami Hind 

Living people
1973 births
Indian Muslim activists
Jamaat-e-Islami
Indian Muslims
People from Nanded
Urdu-language writers